Saint Paul's Island or Saint Paul Island may refer to at least five islands.

Île Saint-Paul, French Southern and Antarctic Lands
St Paul's Island, Malta
Saint Paul Island, Alaska
St. Paul Island, Nova Scotia
Or the former name for Nuns' Island